Qaravəlli (also, Qaravəlili, Kara-Vali, and Karavelli) is a village and municipality in the Agsu Rayon of Azerbaijan.  It has a population of 378.

References 

Populated places in Agsu District